The thrush-like antpitta (Myrmothera campanisona) is a species of bird in the family Grallariidae.

It is found in Bolivia, Brazil, Colombia, Ecuador, French Guiana, Guyana, Peru, Suriname, and Venezuela. In 2018, the South American Classification Committee of the American Ornithological Society split one subspecies as Tapajos antpitta (Mymothera subcanescens).

Its natural habitat is subtropical or tropical moist lowland forest.

References

External links
Image at ADW

thrush-like antpitta
Birds of the Amazon Basin
Birds of the Guianas
thrush-like antpitta
Taxonomy articles created by Polbot